Wildlife on One was, for nearly three decades, the BBC's flagship natural history programme.

First broadcast in 1977, each edition ran for half an hour. The narrator was Sir David Attenborough. When repeated on BBC2, the programmes were retitled Wildlife on Two. The series came to an end in 2005.

Episodes

External links
 
 Wildlife on Two
 

1977 British television series debuts
2005 British television series endings
1970s British documentary television series
1980s British documentary television series
1990s British documentary television series
2000s British documentary television series
BBC television documentaries
Nature educational television series
Animal Planet original programming